The Secret Thoughts of Cats was written and illustrated by Steven Appleby, and first published in 1996. 

Also known as the Infinite Subtlety of Cat Expressions, it focuses on the fact that cat expressions are always the same, no matter what the situation (apart from when asleep or dead). It has a picture of a cat with the same expression on every page, and a description of what it's thinking or doing underneath. It finishes with ‘Afterthoughts’ of cats, a selection of observations made on cat behaviour. The first page is a picture of cat hairs, the last, cat hairs on cushions.
It was written in memory of: Terry, Dibble, Sally, and for Jim.

1996 books
Comedy books
Zoology books
Books about cats